New York State Route 150 (NY 150) is a north–south state highway in Rensselaer County, New York, in the United States. The southern terminus of the route is at NY 9J in Castleton-on-Hudson. Its northern terminus is at a junction with NY 66 in the hamlet of Wynantskill, located within the town of North Greenbush.

Route description

NY 150 begins at an intersection with NY 9J (Main Street) in the village of Castleton-on-Hudson in front of the Hudson River and Amtrak line through the village. Known as Scott Avenue, NY 150 heads up the hills overlooking the village, becoming the main two-lane west–east village street, passing numerous residences. After winding through the village, the route turns northeast into the town of Schodack, where it retains the name Scott Avenue until the junction with County Route 6 (CR 6 or Maple Hill Road / Seaman Avenue). Now known as Brookview Road, NY 150 turns northeastward through Schodack, becoming a two-lane rural street along the Moordener Kill.

Continuing to the northeast, NY 150 reaches the hamlet of Brookview, crossing a junction with the eastern terminus of CR 8 (Western Road). NY 150 continues northeast through the residential section of Brookview, reaching the southern terminus of CR 5 (Brookview Road). At this junction, NY 150 turns eastward through Schodack Valley Road. A residential road through Schodack, NY 150 passes south of Evergreen Cemetery, paralleling the Moodener Kill. At the junction with South Old Post Road, the route crosses under I-90. After crossing under the interstate, NY 150 reaches the southern end of the hamlet of Schodack Center.

In Schodack Center, NY 150 junctions with US 9 and US 20 (Columbia Turnpike). At this junction, NY 150 becomes East Schodack Road, continuing east out of Schodack Center, past Schodack Town Park and a nearby mobile home park. At the junction with Linda Way, the route bends eastward, reaching the residential hamlet of East Schodack. In the center of East Schodack, NY 150 junctions with the northern terminus of CR 7, where it bends northeast, dropping the East Schodack Road moniker. Progressing northeast through Schodack, the rural roadway begins winding northward, reaching the eastern terminus of NY 151 (Luther Road). A short distance northeast of NY 151, NY 150 crosses into the town of Sand Lake.

Now in Sand Lake, NY 150 continues northeast through a rural section of town, bending northward into the hamlet of Sliters, where it junctions with CR 55 (Best Road) and CR 50 (Millers Corners Road). North of Stilers, the route continues north through the town of Sand Lake, remaining a two-lane rural road. NY 150 turns northwest at this junction, reaching the residential hamlet of West Sand Lake. In the center of the hamlet, NY 150 meets a junction with NY 43 (West Sand Lake Road). 

Now in a commercial neighborhood, NY 150 soon leaves West Sand Lake and continues north as West Sand Lake Road. Soon crossing into the town of Poestenkill, NY 150 reaches a junction with CR 68 (Pershing Avenue / Snyders Corners Road) in the hamlet of Snyders Corners. The route through Snyders Corners is residential, crossing into the town of North Greenbush. Retaining the West Sand Lake Road moniker, NY 150 winds northwest into the hamlet of Wynantskill, bypassing the hamlet of Eastmor in the process. Through Wynantskill, NY 150 continues through the center of the hamlet, passing numerous residences until reaching a junction with the terminus of NY 136 (Whiteview Road). 

NY 150 turns northeast on NY 136's right-of-way, going a couple blocks as West Sand Lake Road until a junction with NY 66 (Main Avenue). At this junction, the NY 150 junction terminates at a t-intersection.

History
NY 150 was assigned as part of the 1930 renumbering of state highways in New York to an alignment extending from Castleton-on-Hudson northeastward to Schodack Center. The route was extended northeastward to NY 66 in Wynantskill by the following year.

Major intersections

See also

References

External links

150
Transportation in Rensselaer County, New York